Paul Thalmann (1901–1980) was a Swiss journalist and anarchist. He participated in the Communist party prior to his expulsion in 1929. He fought in the Durruti Column alongside Clara Thalmann during the Spanish Revolution of 1936. They operated a guesthouse in France and supported a variety of political causes.

Notes

References

External links 

 Paul Thalmann/Clara Thalmann Papers at the International Institute of Social History

1901 births
1980 deaths
Swiss anarchists
Swiss expatriates in Spain
Swiss people of the Spanish Civil War
People from Basel-Stadt
Swiss newspaper editors
Foreign volunteers in the Spanish Civil War
Prisoners and detainees of Spain
Swiss people imprisoned abroad
Swiss expatriates in France
20th-century Swiss journalists